Whittier is an unincorporated community and census-designated place (CDP) in Jackson and Swain counties in the western part of the U.S. state of North Carolina. It was first listed as a CDP in the 2020 census with a population of 25.

Whittier is located on the Tuckasegee River, between Bryson City downstream to the west, and Dillsboro upstream to the southeast. The town of Whittier has its own Post Office, located at 22 Main Street.

History
Founded in 1881 by Dr. Clarke Whittier when he purchased  of land in the area, it was incorporated as a town from 1887 to 1933.  The town declined following the collapse of the lumber industry during the Great Depression.

Demographics

2020 census

Note: the US Census treats Hispanic/Latino as an ethnic category. This table excludes Latinos from the racial categories and assigns them to a separate category. Hispanics/Latinos can be of any race.

References

External links
 at USGS GNIS

Populated places in Jackson County, North Carolina
Populated places in Swain County, North Carolina
Communities of the Great Smoky Mountains
Populated places established in 1881
1933 disestablishments in North Carolina
1881 establishments in North Carolina
Populated places disestablished in 1933
Census-designated places in Jackson County, North Carolina
census-designated places in Swain County, North Carolina